221st Brigade may refer to:

 221st Mixed Brigade (Scotland)
 221st Mixed Brigade (Spain)
 221st Independent Infantry Brigade (Home) (United Kingdom)
 221st Brigade, Royal Field Artillery (United Kingdom)